Ghentia millepunctatum is a species of tephritid or fruit flies in the genus Ghentia of the family Tephritidae.

Distribution
Eritrea, South Africa.

References

Tephritinae
Insects described in 1913
Diptera of Africa